St Wilfrid's Church is in Main Street, Melling, Lancashire, England. It is recorded in the National Heritage List for England as a designated Grade I listed building, and is an active Anglican church in the united benefice of East Lonsdale, the deanery of Tunstall, the archdeaconry of Lancaster and the diocese of Blackburn. Its benefice is combined with those of St Peter, Leck, St John the Baptist, Tunstall, St James the Less, Tatham, the Good Shepherd, Lowgill, and Holy Trinity, Wray.

History
The earliest fabric in the church dates from around 1300 or earlier but, as it is near the earthworks of a motte-and-bailey castle, it is possible that a church has been present on the site since the 10th century. Most of the present church dates from the late 15th century, with a restoration in 1763 when the clerestory was added. In 1891 a further restoration was carried out by the Lancaster architects Paley, Austin and Paley. This included reseating the church, and cost £1,100. A chapel known as the Morley chapel had been created as a chantry from a pre-existing chapel by John Morley who fought at Agincourt in 1415. This was heavily re-modelled in 1841 when the altar was removed, and was restored as a chapel in 1994–95.

Architecture
The church is built in sandstone rubble with a stone slate roof. Its plan consists of a west tower, a nave and chancel under a continuous roof with a clerestory, north and south aisles, a south porch and a south chapel. The tower has diagonal buttresses and an embattled parapet. The west window of the south aisle dates from around 1300. This window includes a fragment of medieval stained glass. Internally, the aisle pews date from the 18th century but the nave pews, the screens, the pulpit, and the communion rails are from the late 19th century. In the chapel is an aumbry without a door and a squint. There are numerous memorial wall tablets. Discovered during the restoration and built into the vestry wall is a piece of Norman chevron ornament, part of a crucifix, and part of a grave slab. The stained glass in the east window was designed by Henry Holiday. The organ was built in 1891 by J. W. Walker of London. There is a ring of six bells which were recast in 1754 from three bells made in the 15th century by Rudhall of Gloucester.

Notable burials
Ann Fenwick of Hornby Hall was buried her with her parents in the middle aisle in 1777. She had been a leading Catholic in the area who had appealed to the House of Lords to claim her rights.

External features
In the churchyard is a sandstone sundial dating probably from the 18th century with a brass plate and gnomon which is listed Grade II. Also listed Grade II are the Hodgson tomb chest dating from the early 18th century, and part of the churchyard wall, the steps leading to the gate and the gate piers. In the southwest corner of the churchyard is the war grave of a World War II airman.

See also

Grade I listed buildings in Lancashire
Grade I listed churches in Lancashire
Listed buildings in Melling-with-Wrayton
List of works by Paley, Austin and Paley
Scheduled monuments in Lancashire

References

Church of England church buildings in Lancashire
Grade I listed churches in Lancashire
English Gothic architecture in Lancashire
Gothic Revival architecture in Lancashire
Diocese of Blackburn
Churches in the City of Lancaster